Sergei Leonidovich Vinogradov (born 17 November 1981) is a Russian former professional football player.

Club career
He made his debut in the Russian Premier League in 2001 for FC Krylia Sovetov Samara. He played for FC Krylia Sovetov Samara in the UEFA Cup.

Honours
 Russian Premier League bronze: 2004.
 Russian Cup finalist: 2004.

References

External links

1981 births
Sportspeople from Pskov
Living people
Russian footballers
Russia under-21 international footballers
PFC Krylia Sovetov Samara players
FC Rostov players
FC Kuban Krasnodar players
FC Anzhi Makhachkala players
Russian Premier League players
FC Volga Nizhny Novgorod players
FC Sakhalin Yuzhno-Sakhalinsk players
FC Vitebsk players
Russian expatriate footballers
Expatriate footballers in Belarus
Expatriate footballers in Georgia (country)
Association football forwards